Warren Point is a point in the U.S. state of Washington.

Warren Point was named after Alonzo Warren, proprietor of a local sawmill. Construction of a railroad along Warren Point altered the geography of the cape, and little remains of its former prominence.

References

Landforms of Thurston County, Washington
Headlands of Washington (state)